Lydie may refer to:

Lydie Arickx (born 1954), French artist, with parents of Flemish origin
Lydie Auvray (born 1956), French accordionist, composer and singer
Lydie Denier (born 1964), French model and actress
Lydie Dubedat-Briero (born 1962), French rower
Lydie Err (born 1949), Luxembourgish politician
František Lydie Gahura (1891–1958), Czech architect and sculptor
Lydie Hegewald (1884–1950), German film producer of the silent and early sound eras
Lydie Marland (1900–1987), American socialite
Lydie Pace (born 1968), Central African singer
Lydie Polfer (born 1952), Luxembourgish politician
Lydie Saki (born 1984), Ivorian professional footballer
Lydie Salvayre (born 1948), French writer
Lydie Schmit (1939–1988), Luxembourgish politician and teacher
Lydie Solomon (born 1982), French pianist and actress
Ndoua Lydie Yamkou (born 1984), Ivorian team handball player

See also
Atelier Lydie & Suelle: Alchemists of the Mysterious Painting, a role-playing video game released in Japan for the PlayStation
Lyddie
Lyde (disambiguation)
Lydia (disambiguation)
Lydiane
Lydiate

de:Lydie
fr:Lydie